The Funicular Rigiblick is a funicular railway in the north-east of the city of Zürich, Switzerland. It links a lower station served by Zürich tram routes 9 and 10 and Zürich trolleybus route 33, with an upper station at Rigiblick on the Zürichberg hill.

The Rigiblick funicular is one of two funiculars within the city of Zürich, the other being the Polybahn funicular in the city centre. Additionally, the city's Dolderbahn rack railway was originally a funicular, until its conversion to rack working in the 1970s.

History 
The line first operated on 4 April 1901. In the early 1950s it was refurbished, replacing the original wooden cable cars with metal bodied cars in a red colour scheme. A further refurbishment in the late 1970s resulted in an  extension at the upper end of the line, and the introduction of the current cars, in blue and white.

Operation 
The line is operated by the Verkehrsbetriebe Zürich (VBZ), the municipal transport operator for the city of Zürich, and carries around 600 000 passengers per year. It has the following parameters:

The standard Zürcher Verkehrsverbund zonal fare tariffs apply, with the whole of the line being within fare zone 110 (Zürich city).

See also 
 List of funicular railways
 List of funiculars in Switzerland

References

External links 

 Page on the Seilbahn Rigiblick from the official website of the VBZ 
 
 

Rigiblick
Transport in Zürich
Railway lines opened in 1901
Metre gauge railways in Switzerland